Mehmet Tobias Scholl (born Mehmet Tobias Yüksel; 16 October 1970) is a German football manager and former player.

He played most of his career as an attacking midfielder for Bayern Munich. During his career he won the UEFA Cup in 1996 (scoring a goal in each leg of the final), Euro 1996, and the UEFA Champions League in 2001, as well as eight German Championships (all with Bayern Munich). He retired at the end of the 2006–07 Bundesliga season as one of the most successful German football players of all time.

Scholl was the subject of the 2007 career retrospective documentary film Frei:Gespielt – Mehmet Scholl: Über das Spiel hinaus by directors Ferdinand Neumayr and Eduard Augustin.

Club career
Scholl played for SV Nordwest Karlsruhe (from 1976 to 1982) and Karlsruher SC (from 1982 to 1992) before joining Bayern Munich in July 1992. He stayed at Bayern for the rest of his career, wearing the number 7 shirt. Scholl retired from professional football after the 2006–07 season. In 15 seasons at Bayern he played in 468 competitive matches for Bayern, scoring 116 goals – 88 of these appearances were in European cup competitions (18 goals).

He was one of the Bundesliga's most successful players, winning the championship eight times. Aged 19, he made his Bundesliga debut on 21 April 1990, coming on for Karlsruher SC in the 78th minute of their away match against 1. FC Köln, and promptly scored his team's fifth goal in the 90th minute. He scored 98 goals (11 for Karlsruhe, 87 for Bayern) in 392 Bundesliga matches (58 for Karlsruhe, 334 for Bayern). Scholl has been praised for his technical ability, his creative playmaking, his dribbling skills, and his free kicks. In early 2001, he was voted Player of the Year 2000 by the professional players of the First and Second Bundesliga, and in May 2005, fans voted him one of the eleven greatest Bayern players of all time.

International career

Scholl played 36 matches for the German national team between 1995 and 2002, scoring eight goals. He was part of Germany's winning team at Euro 96 where he played in the quarterfinal, semifinal, and final. In the 69th minute of the final when the Czech Republic was leading 1–0, he was substituted for the then relatively unknown Oliver Bierhoff who went on to score the two goals that turned the match around for Germany, catapulting Bierhoff to national and international fame. Scholl also played in all three of Germany's games at Euro 2000, scoring Germany's only goal in the tournament against Romania.

Scholl repeatedly suffered injuries throughout his career, preventing him from maintaining a regular spot on the national team and eventually prompting him to retire from the national team prior to the 2002 FIFA World Cup, making him one of Germany's most successful players never to have played in a World Cup.

Among German football fans, Scholl was one of the most popular footballers because of his character and his unique skills. Before the 2006 World Cup Campaign, more than 100,000 people signed an online petition, "Mehmet für Deutschland", to persuade Jürgen Klinsmann to include Scholl in the German squad. Despite the public support, Scholl was not included.

International goals
Scores and results list Germany's goal tally first.

Coaching career

On 27 April 2009, he was named as interim head coach for Bayern Munich II. He replaced Hermann Gerland who became assistant coach under Jupp Heynckes and continued to work as under-13 head coach. In July 2009 he was appointed as permanent manager of Bayern II and left the team on 30 June 2010 for a year, working on his coaching licence. Scholl returned to Bayern Munich II as head coach. In January 2013, Scholl announced that he would leave the team at the end of the 2012–13 season because he wanted to focus on his job as a TV pundit and that it conflicted with his work as coach.

Personal life
Scholl was born in Karlsruhe, the second son of Ergin and Hella Yüksel, a Turkish father and a German mother. When he was five, his parents divorced, and his mother then married Hermann Scholl from whom Mehmet acquired his surname.

In May 2002 and October 2003, he released two successful mixtapes, featuring his favourite bands. The compilation's title "Mehmet Scholl kompiliert – Vor dem Spiel ist nach dem Spiel" is a reference to Sepp Herberger's famous expression "nach dem Spiel ist vor dem Spiel" ("after the game is before the game"). In an interview, Scholl said he chose this title because he listens to this music before the game, after the game, in the car on the way to the stadium, and in the car when leaving the stadium. The first volume includes songs by The Beta Band, Sportfreunde Stiller, Jimmy Eat World, and The Notwist (complete track list) among others. The second volume includes songs by Oasis, Wir sind Helden, and The Flaming Lips (complete track list) to name a few. Once a month, he co-presents the feature Mehmets Schollplatten in the program Nachtmix of the Bayern 2 radio station, which is the culturally oriented channel of the federal public broadcaster Bayerischer Rundfunk.

As a young player, Scholl was quoted with the words "hängt die Grünen, solange es noch Bäume gibt" ("hang the Greens while there still are trees"), seemingly expressing his dislike for the German Green Party. He was widely criticized for this quote because most people did not understand his point which was to point out that in the near future there might be no trees left, thereby giving his statement an ironic touch. Even though he made further ironic remarks in this interview ("One thing you'd never do?" "I'd never put a blind man at an advertising pillar and tell him that this is the wall he needs to walk down to get home."), some people did not get the jokes. However, he was sued by a Green politician for instigation to murder and eventually he donated 15,000 DM to charity. Afterwards, Scholl was asked by a journalist which party he would vote for, but he answered: "Green naturally – I cannot leave them hanging" ("Grün natürlich, ich kann sie ja nicht hängenlassen").

Scholl is officially without religious confession, but is an avid follower of Buddhist principles.

Since his retirement from football, he has taken up nine-pin bowling (Kegeln), a sport in which he already excelled as a youth.

Career statistics

Club

International

Managerial statistics

Honours

Club
Bayern Munich
Bundesliga: 1993–94, 1996–97, 1998–99, 1999–2000, 2000–01, 2002–03, 2004–05, 2005–06
DFB-Pokal: 1997–98, 1999–2000, 2002–03, 2004–05, 2005–06
DFB-Ligapokal: 1997, 1998, 1999, 2000, 2004
UEFA Champions League: 2000–01
UEFA Cup: 1995–96
Intercontinental Cup: 2001

International
Germany
UEFA European Championship: 1996

Individual
ESM Team of the Year: 1995–96, 2000–01
kicker Bundesliga Team of the Season: 1997–98, 2000–01
Goal of the Month (Germany): January 2000, December 2000, February 2003
Bravo Otto: 1996, 1997, 2000
Bayern Munich All-time XI

References

Further reading

External links

 Player profile on the Bundesliga's official website
 

1970 births
Living people
Footballers from Karlsruhe
German footballers
Association football midfielders
Karlsruher SC players
Karlsruher SC II players
FC Bayern Munich footballers
Germany international footballers
Germany under-21 international footballers
UEFA Euro 1996 players
1999 FIFA Confederations Cup players
UEFA Euro 2000 players
UEFA European Championship-winning players
German people of Turkish descent
FC Bayern Munich non-playing staff
Bundesliga players
3. Liga managers
UEFA Champions League winning players
UEFA Cup winning players
FC Bayern Munich II managers
German football managers
West German footballers